The  is one of the national seals and is the Emperor of Japan's official seal.

Description
It has two lines of vertical writing, with the right-hand side containing the characters  (Tennō, Emperor), and on the left-hand side containing the characters  (Gyoji, Imperial seal). 

The present Privy Seal is made of pure gold and is about 3 sun (about 9 cm) in size and weighs 4.5 kg. He was commissioned to manufacture the State Seal of Japan within one year, in 1874 (Meiji 7). 

When not in use, the seal is kept in a leather bag. The seal is used with special cinnabar seal ink specially made by the National Printing Bureau.

Use
The Privy Seal of Japan is printed on Imperial rescripts, proclamation of sentences of laws, cabinet orders, treaties, instruments of ratification, ambassadors' credentials and their dismissal documents, documents of general power of attorney, consular commissions, letters authorizing foreign consuls, letters of appointment or dismissal of government officials whose appointment requires the Emperor's attestation, and appointment documents and documents of the Prime Minister and Chief Justice, and their respective dismissals.

At the 2019 Japanese imperial transition, the Privy Seal – together with the State Seal and two of the Imperial Regalia – featured twice during the ceremonies: During the abdication of Emperor Akihito on 30 April, and during the accession of Emperor Naruhito on 1 May, chamberlains carried the seals into the Hall of Pines, where they were placed on tables near the reigning Emperor.

History
The history of the Privy Seal of Japan dates back to the Nara period. Although it was originally made from copper, it was manufactured from stone in 1868 (Meiji) and later, was made from pure gold.

If the State Seal or the Privy Seal are illegally reproduced, the penalty is at least two years or more of terminable penal servitude according to the first clause of Article 164 of the Criminal Code of Japan.

See also
National seals of Japan
Lord Keeper of the Privy Seal of Japan
Heirloom Seal of the Realm (China)
National Seals of the Republic of China
Seal of the State Council of the People's Republic of China
Seal of South Korea

References

External links 
Emperor Showa signing documents and using the State and Privy Seal of Japan 

 

Japan
National symbols of Japan
Japanese monarchy
Japanese heraldry